Marija Snežna may refer to:
 One of the Industrial zones in Novi Sad
 The Slovenian name of The Chapel of Our Lady of the Snows on the Big Pasture Plateau